Kim Jun-ho (born 7 November 1959) is a North Korean sports shooter. He competed in the mixed skeet event at the 1980 Summer Olympics.

References

External links
 

1959 births
Living people
North Korean male sport shooters
Olympic shooters of North Korea
Shooters at the 1980 Summer Olympics
Place of birth missing (living people)